Tanuchitina is an extinct genus of chitinozoans. It was described by Jansonius in 1964.

Species
 Tanuchitina anticostiensis (Achab, 1977)
 Tanuchitina bergstroemi Laufeld, 1967
 Tanuchitina tallinnensis Grahn, 1984

References

Prehistoric marine animals
Fossil taxa described in 1964
Paleozoic life of Quebec